Khalaf Beygluy, also rendered as Khalaf Beyglu, may refer to:
 Khalaf Beygluy-e Olya
 Khalaf Beygluy-e Sofla